Sedgemore is a surname. Notable people with the surname include:

Ben Sedgemore (born 1975), English footballer
Brian Sedgemore (1937–2015), British politician
Jake Sedgemore (born 1978), English footballer, brother of Ben

English-language surnames